Bar Branch is a  long 1st order tributary to Sandy Creek in Pittsylvania County, Virginia.

Course 
Bar Branch rises about 2 miles west of Red Oak Hollow, Virginia in Pittsylvania County and then flows northeast to join Sandy Creek about 1 mile southwest of Pickaway.

Watershed 
Bar Branch drains  of area, receives about 45.3 in/year of precipitation, has a wetness index of 347.97, and is about 53% forested.

See also 
 List of Virginia Rivers

References 

Rivers of Pittsylvania County, Virginia
Rivers of Virginia